The Time Has Come may refer to:

Music 
Albums
 The Time Has Come (7th Heaven album), 1990
 The Time Has Come (Anne Briggs album), 1971
 The Time Has Come (The Chambers Brothers album), 1967
 The Time Has Come (Martina McBride album), 1992
 The Time Has Come (Christy Moore album), 1983
 The Time Has Come (Cassie Ramone album), 2014
 The Time Has Come: The Best of Ziggy Marley & the Melody Makers, 1988

Songs
 "The Time Has Come" (Martina McBride song), 1992
 "The Time Has Come" (Mike Oldfield song), 1987

Other uses 
 The Time Has Come (TV series), a 1960 West German TV series 
 The Time Has Come, a book by K. Ross Toole